Todd Robin Thomas (December 2, 1959 – March 5, 2000) was an American football long snapper, center and offensive tackle. He played college football at University of North Dakota and was drafted by the Kansas City Chiefs in the 1981 NFL Draft in the fifth round with the 124th overall pick.

Early years
Thomas graduated from Cedarburg High School in 1977 and was a letterman in football, baseball, and basketball. In football, he was a tackle as well as the team's long snapper. On February 15, 2014, he was inducted into the Cedarburg High School Athletic Hall of Fame.

College career
He played tackle at North Dakota and also served as the long snapper. In 1981, he graduated with a degree in chemical engineering. He was inducted into the University of North Dakota Letterwinners Association Hall of Fame in 2000.

Professional career

Kansas City Chiefs
The Kansas City Chiefs drafted Thomas in the fifth round (124th overall) in the 1981 NFL Draft. He played in 15 regular season games for the 1981 Chiefs as their long snapper. During a game against the Miami Dolphins on December 13, Thomas suffered a dislocated shoulder. He was placed on injured reserve on December 15 through the remainder of the 1981 season. On September 6, 1982, the Chiefs released him.

United States Football League (USFL)
Thomas signed with the New Jersey Generals of the United States Football League (USFL) on October 15, 1982. He started in 11 games and played in all 18 games during their 1983 inaugural season and was frequently used as a blocking tight end. On February 14, 1984, the New Jersey Generals traded Thomas to the Arizona Wranglers for linebacker Don Goode. Thomas played in ten games for the Wranglers as a tackle / tight end and then was released on May 18, 1984. The Pittsburgh Maulers of the USFL claimed Thomas off waivers from the Arizona Wranglers on May 18, 1984. He played tackle.

Philadelphia Eagles
After two seasons in the USFL, Thomas returned to the National Football League in July 1984 as a center / guard with the Philadelphia Eagles. On August 14, 1984, he was placed on injured reserve with a herniated disc. He remained on injured reserve for the entire 1984 season, and then retired from football due to his back injury.

Later life and death
After ending his football career Thomas utilized his background in chemical engineering, eventually earning seven patents. Moreover, Thomas was considered an expert in under balanced drilling techniques.  Sadly, at the age of 40, Thomas passed away from lung cancer on March 5, 2000. That same year, he was inducted into the University of North Dakota Hall of Fame.

References

Players of American football from Wisconsin
North Dakota Fighting Hawks football players
Kansas City Chiefs players
New Jersey Generals players
Arizona Wranglers players
Pittsburgh Maulers players
People from Cedarburg, Wisconsin
1959 births
2000 deaths
Sportspeople from the Milwaukee metropolitan area
Baseball players from Wisconsin
Basketball players from Wisconsin
American men's basketball players